The Bouie River, sometimes known as the Bowie River, is a tributary of the Leaf River,  long, in southern Mississippi in the United States.  Via the Leaf River, it is part of the watershed of the Pascagoula River, which flows to the Gulf of Mexico.

Course
The Bouie rises in southern Simpson County and flows generally southeastwardly through Jefferson Davis and Covington Counties, forming part of the boundary between the two, and into northwestern Forrest County, where it flows into the Leaf River at Hattiesburg.

Variant names
The United States Board on Geographic Names settled on "Bouie River" as the stream's official name in 1990.  According to the Geographic Names Information System, it has also been known as:
Bone Creek
Boue Creek
Bouie Creek
Bouyer Creek
Bovie River
Bowie Creek (in part, above the mouth of Okatoma Creek)
Bowie River (in part, below the mouth of Okatoma Creek)
Boyer Creek
Buoy Creek

See also
List of Mississippi rivers

References

DeLorme (1998).  Mississippi Atlas & Gazetteer.  Yarmouth, Maine: DeLorme.  .

Rivers of Mississippi
Bodies of water of Covington County, Mississippi
Bodies of water of Forrest County, Mississippi
Bodies of water of Jefferson Davis County, Mississippi
Bodies of water of Simpson County, Mississippi